On is an athletic shoe and performance sportswear company originating in Switzerland that designs and markets sports clothing and running shoes.

As of 2019 the company held 40% of the running shoe market in Switzerland and 10% in Germany. As of mid year 2020, On sports footwear was reported to be available in 6,000 retailers in 55 countries worldwide with the United States being its biggest single market. According to market research firm NPD, On owns 6.6% of the performance running shoe category in the United States.

History
On was first incorporated as a sporting goods company in 2010. The company was founded by former Swiss Ironman champion Olivier Bernhard in partnership with David Allemann and Caspar Coppetti. In 2012, On released the Cloudracer, a performance footwear product favoured by Swiss professional triathlete and London 2012 Olympic gold medal winner Nicola Spirig. The company claims a proprietary cushioning technology in its shoes as its unique selling point; a patented design called CloudTec.

CloudTec began life with Bernhard experimenting with a garden hose, exploring how that shape could offer a brand new type of cushioning. In short, the series of “clouds” that run underneath all On silhouettes offer cushioning as the foot lands on the floor, before locking together to create a solid foundation for pushing off on the next step. "The benefit of it is basically that playing with the structure of it helps you to tune the cushioning for softer landings. As the clouds are compressed in the forefoot it creates a firm and stable platform to push off," explained Edouard Coyon, On’s head of footwear product management in an interview with HYPEBEAST.

Swiss Tennis professional Roger Federer became a shareholder in On AG in November 2019. A limited edition lifestyle shoe named “The Roger” was subsequently released by the company in July 2020. Based on recent sales growth the company is reported to be exploring IPO options for the later half of 2021. The company's IPO raised approximately $746 million.

On also founded and sponsors the professional running group, On Athletics Club, coached by Dathan Ritzenhein with a roster than contains multiple Olympic finalists. The company also built bobsleigh shoes that were used in the 2022 Winter Olympics.

Currently, David Kilgore, an American professional runner and record holder, competes and works for On-running.

On March 31, 2022, On launched the Cloudmonster. It deviates from the company's previous designs by having a larger sole. Jacob Gallagher of The Wall Street Journal described it as "a maximalist sneaker" and claimed that this design is largely associated with Hoka One One, and called Hoka One One "one of On’s main competitors in the specialized running market".

In March 2023, On announced its sponsorship of number one women's tennis player Iga Świątek.

References

External links
 

2021 initial public offerings
Athletic shoe brands
Companies based in Zürich
Companies listed on the New York Stock Exchange
Sportswear brands
Swiss brands
makemyseason.com/zuodi-sport-shoes/